Talassia is a genus of very small sea snails, marine gastropod mollusks in the family Vanikoridae.

Species
Species within the genus Talassia include:
 Talassia coriacea (Manzoni, 1868)
 Talassia dagueneti (de Folin, 1873)
 Talassia flexisculpta Hoffman & Freiwald, 2022
 Talassia laevapex Hoffman & Freiwald, 2022
 Talassia macrostoma (Thiele, 1925)
 Talassia mexicana Hoffman & Freiwald, 2022
 Talassia philippeswi nneni Rolán & Swinnen, 2011
 † Talassia rissoides (Gougerot & Le Renard, 1978) 
 Talassia rugosa Hoffman & Freiwald, 2022
 Talassia sandersoni (A. E. Verrill, 1884)
 Talassia tenuisculpta (Watson, 1873)

References

 Warén A. & Bouchet P. (1988) A new species of Vanikoridae from the western Mediterranean, with remarks on the Northeast Atlantic species of the family. Bollettino Malacologico 24(5-8): 73-100.

External links
 Hoffman, L.; Freiwald, A. (2022). A review of Atlantic deep-water species in the genus Talassia (Caenogastropoda, Vanikoridae). European Journal of Taxonomy. 819.

Vanikoridae